The Umbrella Epidendrum (Epidendrum umbelliferum) is a species of orchid.

umbelliferum
Orchids of Central America
Orchids of Belize